This is the list of villages in Estonia. The list is incomplete.

Existing villages

For alphabetical list, see Estonian Wikipedia :et:Eesti külade loend

Former villages
In English Wikipedia, there are no articles of former villages in Estonia. Former villages which are more known are redirected to existing ones (eg Pullapää).

For the list of former villages, see Estonian Wikipedia :et:Eesti külade loend#Endised külad

Estonian villages outside Estonia
There are also many existing and former villages which are located outside nowadays Estonia border, in Estonian usually it is said "Välis-Eesti külad" or "väliseesti külad"".

Yuzhnaya Liflyandiya, Russia, Primorsky Krai
Verkhnaia Bulanka, Russia, Krasnoyarsk Krai
Verkhnii Suetuk, Russia, Krasnoyarsk Krai

See also
Populated places in Estonia
List of cities and towns in Estonia
List of boroughs in Estonia
Municipalities of Estonia

Literature
Jüri Meomuttel: Eesti asunikud laialises Wene riigis (PDF and DjVu). Esimene katse sõnumid kõikide Eesti asunduste üle tuua, Tartu, Postimees, 1900.
August Nigol: Eesti asundused ja asupaigad Wenemaal, Tartu: Eesti Kirjastuse-Ühisuse "Postimees" print, 1918
August Nigol: Eesti asundused ja asupaigad Wenemaal (PDF and DjVu), Tartu, Eesti Kirjanduse Seltsi Kodumaa Tundmaõppimise Toimekonna toimetised nr. 1, 1918
Гаупт В. Колония ссыльных лютеранского исповедания в Шушенской волости Минусинского округа // Русское географическое общество. Записки Сибирского отдела. Иркутск, 1864. № 7. C. 16–31;
Гаупт В. Состояние колоний ссыльных лютеранского исповедания в Шушенской волости Минусинского округа. 1850–1865 гг. // Вторая памятная книга Енисейской губернии на 1865 и 1866 гг. СПб., 1865. С. 58–78.
Ядринцев Н.М. Рига, Ревель, Нарва и Гельсингфорс в Сибири // Неделя. 1878. № 3.
 Eesti asunduskülade kirjeldus tegevuse kohta; 5 October 1917; Saaga ERA.3372.1.7:1

References 

 
Villages
Estonia